Niel Wright (Frank William Nielsen Wright born 30 September 1933) is  a New Zealand poet, literary critic, bibliographer, publisher, and cultural and political commentator. His major piece of work is his epic poem The Alexandrians, self published in 120 books between 1961 and 2007 and totaling some 36,000 lines. He has since self published 1045 post-Alexandrian poems totaling 8331 lines, of which 681 are triolets. He has also published extensive notes to The Alexandrians.

Life 

Born in Sydenham Christchurch of mixed French, Scandinavian and English ancestry. His first school was Elmwood in Merivale, his second St Albans. He then attended Christchurch Boys' High School.

Wright moved to Wellington in 1953, at first off and on, then permanently from the 1960s. He attended Victoria University of Wellington, earning a BA and  MA (Hons) in English.With a PhD in English, his career was spent in the New Zealand public service.

He is married with one son, one daughter and two grandchildren. He lives in Wellington.

Literary output 

Wright is a prolific author and publisher of his work, he has over 1000 entries listed in the National Library of New Zealand. Almost all are self-published under his imprint Cultural and Political Books, Wellington.

His critical  writings survey New Zealand poetry from 1898 on, covering mainly Georgian but also a few earlier and later writers. From 1985, he has focused  on the Elizabethan and Jacobean dramatists, and since 2002, increasingly on Shakespeare. His major books are  Shakespeare's Ongoing Composition (2008) and Argybargy and the Big D (2009).

He has published essays on numerous New Zealand writers including Maude Ruby Basham (Aunt Daisy), James K. Baxter, George Bouzaid, Alan Claudius Brassington, Alan Brunton, Charles Brasch, Alfred Edward Caddick, Alex Calder, Alistair Campbell, Ronald Brian Castle, R. E. Coury, Charles Doyle, Kate Gerard, Patricia Godsiff, C. W. Grace, Arnold Grierson Lamont Cork, D'Arcy Cresswell, Peter Crisp, Allen Curnow, Eileen Duggan, E. L. Eyre, Bernard Gadd, Michele Leggott, Arthur Frederick Thomas Chorlton, Leigh Davis, Arthur Rex Dugard Fairburn, Gerald Fitzgerald, Patricia Fry, Ruth Gilbert, Denis Glover, Alexander Connell Hanlon, Robin Hyde, Noel Farr Hoggard, Louis Johnson, John Liddell Kelly, Dennis List, Iain Lonie, Bill Manhire, Katherine Mansfield, Charles Allan Marris, Frank McKay,  Philip Mincher, Barry Mitcalfe, Count Geoffrey Potocki de Montalk, Peter Munz, Walter Edward Murphy, Marjory Lydia Nicholls, Esma North, Victor O'Leary, W. H. Oliver, Vincent O'Sullivan, Charles Stuart Perry, Mark Pirie, Mary E. Richmond, Harry Ricketts, Betty Riddell, J. H. E.Schroder, Rosemary Seymour, Kendrick Smithyman, Charles Spear, C. K. Stead, John Pyne Snadden, J. E. Weir, Karl Wolfskehl and the Australian writer Pamela Travers.

Among the British authors he has written on are Rupert Brooke, Robert Browning, Robin George Collingwood, Frances Cornford, William Davenant, Richard Edwardes, T. S. Eliot, J. M. Edmonds, George Rostrevor Hamilton, Thomas Hardy, John Marston, Thomas Middleton, John Milton, Anthony Munday, Wilfred Owen, George Peele, Geoffrey Pollett, William Rowley, Percy Bysshe Shelley, Anthony Thwaite, Alfred Tennyson and William Wordsworth. He  has also written on Goethe.

Among the New Zealand bibliographers and critics he has written on are Peter Alcock, Rowan Gibbs, Don McKenzie and Joan Stevens. He has published bibliographies of Ivan Bootham, Jeremy Commons, Mark Pirie and Michael O'Leary.

Wright's published works include plays, filmscripts, novels, short stories and two verse novellas.

His earliest plays date from the 1950s. From 1984 all his plays have been written in verse. They include Orestes in Phthia, Apollonius at Rome and Women of Sparta. He has also written three filmscripts: Mysterious Eve, Wolf's Gorge, or Operation Fullscale, and Across the Ningthi. His novels include Underprivileged Lovers, Strangers in the Blood, Caisson, and The Last Time I Saw Turfit. His latest is Weston Burley's Business in Great Waters (2007). He has also written The Fall of the Modern West, a book on the philosophy of history.

He has published two major works of literary autobiography: Brilliantly Wright (1989) and Being, Obsession and Besetment (2007).

Wright's most recent work is The Pop Artist's Garland: Selected Poems 1952-2009, drawing on his epic poem The Alexandrians as well as his post-Alexandrian work.

Reviews and critical studies 

James Bertram, "The Last Maker", New Zealand Listener, 12 August 1978, p. 71
Peter Dronke, Reviews, Landfall, September 1964, pp. 277–280
John Sebastian Hales, An introductory essay: Niel Wright and his epic, Wellington (author), 1976.
Chris Hilliard,"Mad by Auckland Standards", The Pandar 3, Autumn 1998, Auckland
Robert Johnson, "Extracts from a growing epic", Palmerston North Evening Standard, 12 September 1980
Catherine Robertson, "The Perverse Poet", The Dominion Post "Indulgence" magazine, 29 December 2007, p. 3
Joe Wylie, Review, Takahe 54, 2005

References

1933 births
New Zealand poets
New Zealand male poets
New Zealand literary critics
Victoria University of Wellington alumni
Living people
New Zealand publishers (people)
People educated at Christchurch Boys' High School